Sankofa (Amharic: ሳንኮፋ) is a 1993 Ethiopian-produced drama film directed by Haile Gerima centered on the Atlantic slave trade. The storyline features Oyafunmike Ogunlano, Kofi Ghanaba, Mutabaruka, Alexandra Duah, and Afemo Omilami. The word Sankofa derives its meaning from the Ghanaian Akan language which means to "go back, look for, and gain wisdom, power and hope," according to Dr. Anna Julia Cooper. The word Sankofa stresses the importance of one not drifting too far away from one's past in order to progress in the future. In the film, Sankofa is depicted by a bird and the chants and drumming of a Divine Drummer. Gerima's film showed the importance of not having people of African descent drift far away from their African roots. Gerima used the journey of the character Mona to show how the African perception of identity included recognizing one's roots and "returning to one’s source" (Gerima).

Plot
The film starts off with an elderly Divine Drummer, Sankofa (played by Kofi Ghanaba), playing Fontomfrom drums chanting the phrase "Lingering spirit of the dead, rise up." This is his form of communication with the ancestors of the African land, specifically Ghana. His drumming is essential in bringing the spirit of his ancestors, who died during the Maafa back home. The story then goes on to show Mona (Oyafunmike Ogunlano), a contemporary African-American model in a photo session on the coast of Ghana.

The session takes place at Cape Coast Castle where she writhes on the ground as the photographer encourages her to imagine she's having sex with the camera. Mona is unaware of the history of West African slave factories like Cape Coast Castle slave trade because she has been disconnected from her African roots for so long. While Mona is on the beach modeling, she encounters the mysterious old man Sankofa who was playing the drums at the beginning of the film.

Sankofa persistently reminds Mona to remember her past and is insistent that Cape Coast Castle, a former slave factory, is a sacred place, as he conjures up the spirits of the enslaved Africans who were taken in chains from Cape Coast to the Americas. He attempts to block tourists from entering this infamous slave factory. When Mona enters the slave factory, she is transported back in time where she is surrounded by many enslaved Africans. Mona attempts to run out of the slave factory and is met by European slave traders who she tries to reason with by claiming that she is free. The slave traders pay no attention to Mona's claim dragging her to a fire where they strip off her clothing, and brand her with a hot iron.

Mona then takes on the life of a house servant named Shola "to live the life of her enslaved ancestors." She is taken to the Lafayette plantation in the Southern United States where she suffers abuse by her slave masters and is often a victim of rape. On the plantation, Shola encounters Nunu (Alexandra Duah), an African-born field hand who remembers the "old ways" and was characterized as a "strong motherly slave with a rebel mindset"; Noble Ali (Afemo Omilami), a headman with split loyalty between his masters and fellow slaves and who deeply loved Nunu and refused to let anything happen to her; and Shango (Mutabaruka), a rebellious West Indian slave who was sold to the Lafeyettes' after being deemed a trouble-maker and who soon became the lover of Shola.

Shango is named after the Yoruba god of thunder and lightning, and displays loyalty to his fellow slaves to the extent that he would risk his own life. There are many instances where he gets himself in trouble for attempting to fight on behalf of another slave. He often performs rebellious acts such as trying to get Shola to poison the overseer or even cutting down sugar canes out of anger. When asked why he will not simply run away from the plantation, he says it is because he cannot leave his fellow slaves behind. Both Nunu and Shango resist and rebel against the slave system by doing everything in their power to gain freedom. Shola witnesses Nunu and Shango being actively involved in a secret society that had meetings at night and had memberships consisting of slaves from the Lafayette plantation as well as other plantations.  At first, Shola claims that she cannot get herself to join the secret society due to Christian beliefs. The slaves of the society altogether decide to execute a revolt which leaves a bunch of sugar cane land in ashes.

Nunu comes into conflict with her own mixed-race son, Joe, who is fathered by a white man who raped Nunu on a slave ship. Joe (Nick Medley) has been made a head slave and often has to discipline other slaves in order to keep his master happy. Joe completely neglects his African identity and considers himself a white Christian male. He is brainwashed by Father Raphel (Reginald Carter) who teaches Joe that the Africans on the plantation, including his own mother, are devil worshippers and that Joe could not identify with them. Joe ends up killing his mother, Nunu, because he believes that she is possessed. He later realizes that his action was demoralizing and that he had no reason to forgive himself. After Nunu's death, some believe that she was metaphorically able to return home on the wings of a bird, meaning that her deep desire to return to Africa was finally fulfilled.

Throughout the film, Shola gradually transforms from being a compliant slave to one that gains rebellious instincts after being given the Sankofa bird by Shango. The bird once belonged to Shango's father and Shango decided to pass it on to Shola after she was flogged for attempting to run away. Inspired by Nunu and Shango's determination to defy the system, Shola joins them in fighting back against her masters in a rebellion where she retaliates at her white rapist and kills him. After her trials, Shola returns to the present as Mona, deeply aware of her African roots. She is greeted by a woman who says "My child, welcome back" and walks past the photographer who symbolizes colonialism and westernization. Mona is now enlightened and is captivated by the sound of Sankofa's chants and his African drum. She joins a group of black people who have also learned what Sankofa really means and are reconnecting to their roots. Nunu comes out of the slave castle while Mona was in a trance and sheds tears of joy. Meanwhile, Sankofa the Divine Drummer plays his drums, chanting: "Lingering spirit of the dead, rise up and possess the stolen spirit of those stolen in Africa." The film ends with a bird soaring high in the sky signifying the final liberation of those who had found the true meaning of the word "Sankofa" and had reconnected to their past.

Cast
Sankofa, Kofi Ghanaba
Mona/Shola, Oyafunmike Ogunlano
Nunu, Alexandra Duah
Joe, Nick Medley
Shango, Mutabaruka
Afemo Omilami
Reggie Carter
Mzuri
Jimmy Lee Savage
Hasinatu Camara
Jim Faircloth
Stanley Michelson
John A. Mason
Louise Reid
Roger Doctor
Alditz McKenzie
Chrispan Rigby
Maxwell Parris
Hossana Ghanaba

Critical reception 
Sankofa won the grand prize at the African Cinema Festival in Italy and Best Cinematography at the FESPACO Pan-African Film Festival in Burkina Faso.

The film is also listed as one of the 500 Utterly Essential Movies to Cultivate Great Taste in Cinema by professors of Film Studies at Harvard University, under the heading "the most essential films in the history of world cinema, 1980-2000."

"The film was met with great approval by the audience, which was as deeply moved as I was by this epic two-hour drama." (William Beik, July 1994)

"Haile Gerima's poetic and precisely detailed film takes its audience into its heroine's life and mind as her moral sense is challenged and changed. No viewer can avoid the discomforting questions the film so eloquently raises."

"The Ethiopian-born Gerima, best known for "Bush Mama"—his 1976 portrait of an impoverished woman living in Watts—has brought a distinctive style and an often raw but always authoritative command of his medium to confront the horrors of slavery and its persisting significance, perhaps as no other filmmaker has."

"Sankofa (1993) is a compelling historical account of the Maafa, the African Holocaust. This rich film illustrates slavery from the view that many Blacks have been denied, their history. It explores the themes of loss of identity and racial consciousness; respecting and returning to our ancestral roots; and recognizing the connections that exist between people of African descent who live throughout the world."

"Clearly, Gerima intends for Sankofa to expand the boundaries of Black representation in ways that include more diverse, realistic, and empowering images and, in turn, enable Black audiences to see themselves in new ways that are divorced from dominant images."

Nominations
The film was nominated for the Golden Bear at the 43rd Berlin International Film Festival.

Re-release

In 2021, ARRAY remastered the movie in 4K with a limited theatrical run and releasing on Netflix on September 24, 2021.  It had its L.A. re-release debut at DuVernay’s Array Creative Campus.

See also
Africanfuturism
List of films featuring slavery
Afrofuturism in film

Further reading 
 Pamela Woolford, PDF "Filming Slavery: A Conversation with Haile Gerima" Transition, No. 64. (1994), pp. 90–104.

References

External links
 Sankofa Official Site
 

Films about American slavery
Films set in Ghana
1993 films
Burkinabé drama films
English-language Burkinabé films
1993 drama films
German drama films
English-language German films
Ghanaian drama films
English-language Ghanaian films
Films directed by Haile Gerima
American drama films
British drama films
Body swapping in films
Afrofuturist films
Ethiopian drama films
English-language Ethiopian films
1990s English-language films
1990s American films
1990s British films
1990s German films